Road Rage is the second extended play,  by Australian Ska band Area-7.

Track listing
"Road Rage"
"Disarray"
"Skin Deep"
"Soul Stomper"
"Peter Mac"
"B.A. Song"
"Healthy Body (Sick Mind)"*

*Healthy Body (Sick Mind) is a cover of a song originally recorded by Operation Ivy.

1997 EPs
Area-7 albums